Brontopus is an ichnogenus of therapsid footprint, possibly produced by dinocephalians or dicynodonts.

References

Trace fossils